Stapelia hirsuta, common name starfish flower or carrion plant, is a species of flowering plant belonging to the family Apocynaceae.

Name and synonyms
The genus epithet "Stapelia" was named in honour of Johannes van Stapel, who described the first plant discovered, while the Latin species name “hirsuta” means "hairy”.

Tridentea depressa Haw. ex Schult.
Stissera patula Kuntze
Stissera hirsuta Kuntze
Stissera depressa Kuntze
Stapelia unguipetala N. E. Br.
Stapelia sororia Jacq.
Stapelia patula var. longirostris 
Stapelia patula Willd.
Stapelia patentirostris N. E. Br.
Stapelia lanigera Loudon
Stapelia hirsuta var. unguipetala (N. E. Br.) N. E. Br.
Stapelia hirsuta var. patula (Willd.) N. E. Br.
Stapelia hirsuta var. lutea N. E. Br.
Stapelia hirsuta var. longirostris (N. E. Br.) N. E. Br.
Stapelia hirsuta var. grata N. E. Br.
Stapelia hirsuta var. depressa (Jacq.) N. E. Br.
Stapelia hirsuta var. comata (Jacq.) N. E. Br.
Stapelia hirsuta var. affinis (N. E. Br.) N. E. Br.
Stapelia elongata Sweet
Stapelia depressa Jacq.
Stapelia comata Jacq.
Stapelia affinis N. E. Br.
Gonostemon hirsutus var. luteus (N. E. Br.) P.V. Heath
Gonostemon hirsutus var. longirostris (N. E. Br.) P.V. Heath
Gonostemon hirsutus var. gratus (N. E. Br.) P.V. Heath
Gonostemon hirsutus var. depressus (Jacq.) P.V. Heath
Gonostemon hirsutus var. comatus (Jacq.) P.V. Heath
Gonostemon hirsutus var. affinis (N. E. Br.) P.V. Heath
Gonostemon hirsutus (L.) P.V. Heath

Description

Concave groves run vertically along the stems, between their four angles. This feature can sometimes help to distinguish S. hirsuta from many other Stapelia species with which it naturally co-occurs (e.g. Stapelia rufa, Stapelia engleriana) that typically have stems which are also subquadrangular, but which are more rounded in cross-section. The surface of S.hirsuta stems are also usually shortly pubescent. Leaf rudiments are 1-2mm long. 
Populations growing on sandstones can be glabrous stemmed, stemmed with purple mottling.

Flowers
The flowers are flat, very hairy, dark-red and resemble rotting meat. The carrion smell serve to attract various pollinators, especially flies. The flowering period extends from late summer through late autumn.

Subspecies
This species is extremely variable with various subspecies and many hybrids.
 Stapelia hirsuta baylissii
 Stapelia hirsuta gariepensis
 Stapelia hirsuta tsomoensis
 Stapelia hirsuta vetula

Distribution and habitat
This species is endemic to South Africa and southern Namibia.

Its wide distribution extends along the southern edge of the arid Karoo region, throughout the "Little Karoo" in the southern Cape, as far west as the Robertson Karoo and the Swartland just outside Cape Town. It can be found in the mainly winter rainfall areas, in the far west of South Africa, northwards through the Namaqualand region, as far north as southern Namibia. It is absent from the interior of South Africa.

References

hirsuta